The Roman Catholic Diocese of Uromi (Dioecesis Uromiensis) in Uromi, Edo State, Nigeria was created on December 14, 2005, when it was split off from the Archdiocese of Benin City. It is a suffragan diocese of the Archdiocese of Benin City. Its first bishop was Augustine Obiora Akubeze (who was named Archbishop of Benin City in March 2011). The St Anthony of Padua church in Uromi was selected to be its cathedral.
The canonical erection of the diocese and the episcopal ordination of the bishop took place on Saturday, February 25, 2006.

The diocese covers an area of 2,800 km² of the Edo State, covering the local government areas of Esan West, Esan Central, Esan North-East, Esan South-East and Igueben. Neighboring dioceses are Auchi to the north, Issele-Uku to the south and Benin City to the west.

The total population in the diocese is 780,000, of which 102,045 are catholic. The diocese is subdivided into 23 parishes Mass Centres.

Bishops of Uromi 

 Augustine Obiora Akubeze (2005 - 2011), appointed Archbishop of Benin City
 Donatus Aihmiosion Ogun, OSA (2015–Present)

External links
Official website of the Diocese of Uromi
GCatholic.org information
Catholic-hierarchy.org
Vatican press release on the creation

Uromi
Roman Catholic Ecclesiastical Province of Benin City